Lorelei Travis is a fictional character, a mutant appearing in American comic books published by Marvel Comics. Her first appearance was in District X #1 (May 2004).

Fictional character biography

Living in Mutant Town
Lorelei Travis is the name of a young girl who has "living" hair. Lorelei is an exotic dancer at the mob leader Daniel Kaufman's Wildkat Klub in Mutant Town located in New York City. Lorelei had managed to become one of the Wildkat Klub's household names through the artistic use of her genetic mutation.

During a recent investigation into Kaufman's businesses by Lucas Bishop and Ismael Ortega, Lorelei survived a bombing of the Wildkat Klub perpetrated by Kaufman's enemies, sustaining minor injuries.

M-Day and The 198
Lorelei is one of the few mutants to retain her powers after the effects of M-Day, although she is attacked outside her work by a group of militant Purity members. They cut all of her hair simply because she is still a mutant. Unlikely help comes in the form of Toad who, after saving her, escorts her to the X-Mansion to join the other members of the 198. Her hair is restored by the healing powers of Mr. M whom she starts a relationship with not long after and she barely leaves his side. When the O*N*E implant chips in the mutants necks, they all learn that they cannot leave the estate whenever they please and if they misbehave, they receive an electric shock. After Mr. M removes them, she suggests to Mr. M that they leave and anyone who wants to, can come with them.

Mr. M leads the mutants to a nearby island in the middle of a lake and are joined by the O*N*E and the X-Men. A fight breaks out and Scalphunter has a gun pointed at Beast's head. Lorelei gets involved and Scalphunter punches her, this makes Mr. M furious which eventually leads to his death by Magma, who is being manipulated by a mutant by the name of Johnny Dee.

Lorelei and Leech comfort each other by his coffin. They fall asleep and then they wake up, Mr. M's body is gone.

Civil War
A group of superheroes known as the New Warriors accidentally blow up a town causing the general public to turn on superheroes and eventually ignite a superhero civil war. Domino, Shatterstar and Caliban break out the 198 and take them to a bunker in the middle of the desert. Outside the X-Men get involved with a fight against Bishop and the O*N*E, and Domino wants to help them. Lorelei notices that Cyclops is being controlled by Johnny Dee and recounts the story of the first few days at the 198 encampment. She is then used by Dee along with Outlaw and other mutants to attack Domino and Shatterstar. When Dee's efforts are revealed, the bunker is sealed by the military. Eventually the 198 are freed from the bunker.

Dark Reign
Lorelei reappears in San Francisco, meeting with Hellion, Match, and several others when Norman Osborn institutes a curfew on the city. Believing this to be a last stand for mutant rights, Hellion gathers the group at a bar with the intent to break curfew and get arrested on TV in non-violent protest. The group fails to make its intended point as Match torches the surrounding area with his powers, and Lorelei is arrested by Emma Frost and her Dark X-Men. They are taken into custody after a battle. Eventually Lorelei and the other imprisoned mutants are freed by the X-Force and teleported to the island of Utopia.

Powers and abilities
Lorelei has prehensile hair, which allows her to animate her hair through mental control. However, despite it seems she is able to accelerate the growing of her hair it does not seem to be especially durable.

Other versions

Mutopia
Lorelei Travis works as an attendant to Absolon Mercator at the Center for Illumination and Transformation, a center that focuses on unleashing the mutant potential in a child through the Rite of Transformation. Lorelei has prehensile hair, which allows her to animate her hair through mental control. However, despite being able to accelerate the growing of her hair it does not seem to be especially durable.

House of M
In the House of M alternate timeline, Lorelei works in a facility along with Absolon Mercator called the Centre for Transformation and Illumination, a center that focuses on unleashing the mutant potential in a child through the Rite of Transformation.

References

External links
Uncannyxmen.net character bio on Lorelei Travis
 

Comics characters introduced in 2004
Fictional characters who can stretch themselves
Fictional dancers
Marvel Comics mutants
Marvel Comics female characters